Decision theory (or the theory of choice; not to be confused with choice theory) is a branch of applied probability theory and analytic philosophy concerned with the theory of making decisions based on assigning probabilities to various factors and assigning numerical consequences to the outcome. 

There are three branches of decision theory:
 Normative decision theory: Concerned with the identification of optimal decisions, where optimality is often determined by considering an ideal decision-maker who is able to calculate with perfect accuracy and is in some sense fully rational. 
 Prescriptive decision theory: Concerned with describing observed behaviors through the use of conceptual models, under the assumption that those making the decisions are behaving under some consistent rules.
 Descriptive decision theory: Analyzes how individuals actually make the decisions that they do.

Decision theory is closely related to the field of game theory and is an interdisciplinary topic, studied by economists, mathematicians, data scientists, psychologists, biologists, political and other social scientists, philosophers and computer scientists.

Empirical applications of this theory are usually done with the help of statistical and econometric methods.

Normative and descriptive
Normative decision theory is concerned with identification of optimal decisions where optimality is often determined by considering an ideal decision maker who is able to calculate with perfect accuracy and is in some sense fully rational. The practical application of this prescriptive approach (how people ought to make decisions) is called decision analysis and is aimed at finding tools, methodologies, and software (decision support systems) to help people make better decisions.

In contrast, descriptive decision theory is concerned with describing observed behaviors often under the assumption that those making decisions are behaving under some consistent rules. These rules may, for instance, have a procedural framework (e.g. Amos Tversky's elimination by aspects model) or an axiomatic framework (e.g. stochastic transitivity axioms), reconciling the Von Neumann-Morgenstern axioms with behavioral violations of the expected utility hypothesis, or they may explicitly give a functional form for time-inconsistent utility functions (e.g. Laibson's quasi-hyperbolic discounting).

Prescriptive decision theory is concerned with predictions about behavior that positive decision theory produces to allow for further tests of the kind of decision-making that occurs in practice. In recent decades, there has also been increasing interest in "behavioral decision theory", contributing to a re-evaluation of what useful decision-making requires.

Types of decisions

Choice under uncertainty 

The area of choice under uncertainty represents the heart of decision theory. Known from the 17th century (Blaise Pascal invoked it in his famous wager, which is contained in his Pensées, published in 1670), the idea of expected value is that, when faced with a number of actions, each of which could give rise to more than one possible outcome with different probabilities, the rational procedure is to identify all possible outcomes, determine their values (positive or negative) and the probabilities that will result from each course of action, and multiply the two to give an "expected value", or the average expectation for an outcome; the action to be chosen should be the one that gives rise to the highest total expected value.  In 1738, Daniel Bernoulli published an influential paper entitled Exposition of a New Theory on the Measurement of Risk, in which he uses the St. Petersburg paradox to show that expected value theory must be normatively wrong. He gives an example in which a Dutch merchant is trying to decide whether to insure a cargo being sent from Amsterdam to St Petersburg in winter. In his solution, he defines a utility function and computes expected utility rather than expected financial value.

In the 20th century, interest was reignited by Abraham Wald's 1939 paper pointing out that the two central procedures of sampling-distribution-based statistical-theory, namely hypothesis testing and parameter estimation, are special cases of the general decision problem.  Wald's paper renewed and synthesized many concepts of statistical theory, including loss functions, risk functions, admissible decision rules, antecedent distributions, Bayesian procedures, and minimax procedures.  The phrase "decision theory" itself was used in 1950 by E. L. Lehmann.

The revival of subjective probability theory, from the work of Frank Ramsey, Bruno de Finetti, Leonard Savage and others, extended the scope of expected utility theory to situations where subjective probabilities can be used. At the time, von Neumann and Morgenstern's theory of expected utility proved that expected utility maximization followed from basic postulates about rational behavior.

The work of Maurice Allais and Daniel Ellsberg showed that human behavior has systematic and sometimes important departures from expected-utility maximization (Allais paradox and Ellsberg paradox). The prospect theory of Daniel Kahneman and Amos Tversky renewed the empirical study of economic behavior with less emphasis on rationality presuppositions. It describes a way by which people make decisions when all of the outcomes carry a risk. Kahneman and Tversky found three regularities – in actual human decision-making, "losses loom larger than gains"; persons focus more on changes in their utility-states than they focus on absolute utilities; and the estimation of subjective probabilities is severely biased by anchoring.

Intertemporal choice

Intertemporal choice is concerned with the kind of choice where different actions lead to outcomes that are realised at different stages over time. It is also described as cost-benefit decision making since it involves the choices between rewards that vary according to magnitude and time of arrival. If someone received a windfall of several thousand dollars, they could spend it on an expensive holiday, giving them immediate pleasure, or they could invest it in a pension scheme, giving them an income at some time in the future.  What is the optimal thing to do?  The answer depends partly on factors such as the expected rates of interest and inflation, the person's life expectancy, and their confidence in the pensions industry.  However even with all those factors taken into account, human behavior again deviates greatly from the predictions of prescriptive decision theory, leading to alternative models in which, for example, objective interest rates are replaced by subjective discount rates.

Interaction of decision makers
Some decisions are difficult because of the need to take into account how other people in the situation will respond to the decision that is taken.  The analysis of such social decisions is more often treated under the label of game theory, rather than decision theory, though it involves the same mathematical methods. From the standpoint of game theory, most of the problems treated in decision theory are one-player games (or the one player is viewed as playing against an impersonal background situation). In the emerging field of socio-cognitive engineering, the research is especially focused on the different types of distributed decision-making in human organizations, in normal and abnormal/emergency/crisis situations.

Complex decisions
Other areas of decision theory are concerned with decisions that are difficult simply because of their complexity, or the complexity of the organization that has to make them. Individuals making decisions are limited in resources (i.e. time and intelligence) and are therefore boundedly rational; the issue is thus, more than the deviation between real and optimal behaviour, the difficulty of determining the optimal behaviour in the first place. One example is the model of economic growth and resource usage developed by the Club of Rome to help politicians make real-life decisions in complex situations. Decisions are also affected by whether options are framed together or separately; this is known as the distinction bias.

Heuristics

Heuristics in decision-making is the ability of making decisions based on unjustified or routine thinking. While quicker than step-by-step processing, heuristic thinking is also more likely to involve fallacies or inaccuracies. The main use for heuristics in our daily routines is to decrease the amount of evaluative thinking we perform when making simple decisions, making them instead based on unconscious rules and focusing on some aspects of the decision, while ignoring others. One example of a common and erroneous thought process that arises through heuristic thinking is the Gambler's Fallacy — believing that an isolated random event is affected by previous isolated random events. For example, if a fair coin is flipped to tails for a couple of turns, it still has the same probability (i.e., 0.5) of doing so in future turns, though intuitively it seems more likely for it to roll heads soon. This happens because, due to routine thinking, one disregards the probability and concentrates on the ratio of the outcomes, meaning that one expects that in the long run the ratio of flips should be half for each outcome. Another example is that decision-makers may be biased towards preferring moderate alternatives to extreme ones. The Compromise Effect operates under a mindset that the most moderate option carries the most benefit. In an incomplete information scenario, as in most daily decisions, the moderate option will look more appealing than either extreme, independent of the context, based only on the fact that it has characteristics that can be found at either extreme.

Alternatives
A highly controversial issue is whether one can replace the use of probability in decision theory with something else.

Probability theory
Advocates for the use of probability theory point to:
   the work of Richard Threlkeld Cox for justification of the probability axioms,
   the Dutch book paradoxes of Bruno de Finetti as illustrative of the theoretical difficulties that can arise from departures from the probability axioms, and
   the complete class theorems, which show that all admissible decision rules are equivalent to the Bayesian decision rule for some utility function and some prior distribution (or for the limit of a sequence of prior distributions). Thus, for every decision rule, either the rule may be reformulated as a Bayesian procedure (or a limit of a sequence of such), or there is a rule that is sometimes better and never worse.

Alternatives to probability theory
The proponents of fuzzy logic, possibility theory, quantum cognition, Dempster–Shafer theory, and info-gap decision theory maintain that probability is only one of many alternatives and point to many examples where non-standard alternatives have been implemented with apparent success; notably, probabilistic decision theory is sensitive to assumptions about the probabilities of various events, whereas non-probabilistic rules, such as minimax, are robust in that they do not make such assumptions.

Ludic fallacy

A general criticism of decision theory based on a fixed universe of possibilities is that it considers the "known unknowns", not the "unknown unknowns": it focuses on expected variations, not on unforeseen events, which some argue have outsized impact and must be considered – significant events may be "outside model". This line of argument, called the ludic fallacy, is that there are inevitable imperfections in modeling the real world by particular models, and that unquestioning reliance on models blinds one to their limits.

See also 

 Bayesian epistemology
 Bayesian statistics
 Causal decision theory
 Choice modelling
 Constraint satisfaction
 Daniel Kahneman
 Decision making
 Decision quality
 Emotional choice theory
 Evidential decision theory
 Game theory
 Multi-criteria decision making
 Newcomb's paradox
 Operations research
 Optimal decision
 Preference (economics)
 Prospect theory
 Quantum cognition
 Rational choice theory
 Rationality
 Secretary problem
 Signal detection theory
 Small-numbers game
 Stochastic dominance
 TOTREP
 Two envelopes problem

References

Further reading 

 
  (an overview of the philosophical foundations of key mathematical axioms in subjective expected utility theory – mainly normative)
 
 
 
  (covers normative decision theory)
 
  (translation of 1931 article)
 
 de Finetti, Bruno.  "Foresight: its Logical Laws, Its Subjective Sources," (translation of the 1937 article in French) in H. E. Kyburg and H. E. Smokler (eds), Studies in Subjective Probability, New York: Wiley, 1964.
 de Finetti, Bruno. Theory of Probability, (translation by AFM Smith of 1970 book) 2 volumes, New York: Wiley, 1974-5.
 De Groot, Morris, Optimal Statistical Decisions. Wiley Classics Library. 2004. (Originally published 1970.) .
  (covers both normative and descriptive theory)
 
 Khemani, Karan, Ignorance is Bliss: A study on how and why humans depend on recognition heuristics in social relationships, the equity markets and the brand market-place, thereby making successful decisions, 2005.
 Klebanov, Lev. B., Svetlozat T. Rachev and Frank J. Fabozzi, eds. (2009). Non-Robust Models in Statistics, New York: Nova Scientific Publishers, Inc.
  A rational presentation of probabilistic analysis.
 
 
 
  Reprinted in Shafer & Pearl. (also about normative decision theory)
  http://psychclassics.yorku.ca/Peirce/small-diffs.htm
 
 
 
 
 Ramsey, Frank Plumpton; "Truth and Probability" (PDF), Chapter VII in The Foundations of Mathematics and other Logical Essays (1931).
 
 
 

 
Statistical inference
Risk
Control theory
Formal sciences
Epistemology of science
Mathematical and quantitative methods (economics)